"Revolt" is a song by the English rock band Muse from their seventh studio album, Drones (2015). It was released as the third single from the album on 4 November 2015.

Song description
In his review of the album, Gigwise's Andrew Trendell called the song a "squelchy synth-fuelled call to arms and power ballad for the space-age, somewhere between Bryan Adams, Journey and Eurovision". The NME'''s Mark Beaumont described the song as "a two-speed storm built on monumental riffs".

Music video
The "theatrical" video features the band "performing against a backdrop of dystopian warfare between man and drone". Shot in Prague, the band "wanted the video in black and white only using color to represent revolution". The video was made available on Apple Music, while a 'Virtual Reality' version can be viewed on vrse.com. The video is in 360°.

Reception
Reaction to the song was mixed. While NME'''s Mark Beaumont ranked "Revolt" among the band's "most creative songs", Consequence of Sound's Collin Brennan likened it to the "overblown theatrics of Queen". Calling it "a catchy, occasionally rousing song with a couple of neat tricks up its sleeve", he concludes that the song ultimately fails to be the "convincing call to action" it seemingly intends to be.

Charts

References

2014 songs
2015 singles
Muse (band) songs
Song recordings produced by Robert John "Mutt" Lange
Songs written by Matt Bellamy
Warner Records singles